Andreas Panayitou Filiotis  (born 31 May 1995) is a Cypriot professional football player who plays for Cypriot First Division club Apollon Limassol.

Career
He started his career with Omonia, making his first appearance for the senior squad during the 2012–13 season on Cypriot Cup.

Career statistics

Club

References

External links

1995 births
Living people
Greek footballers
Cypriot First Division players
AC Omonia players
Sportspeople from Nicosia
Association football defenders
Pafos FC players